Sebuyau is a small coastal town in Simunjan District, Samarahan Division, Sarawak, Malaysia. Most of its inhabitants are made up of the Malay and the Iban people.

Education

Primary school
SK Tuanku Bagus Sebuyau
SJK (C) Chung Hua Sebuyau

Secondary school
SMK Sebuyau

External links
 Sebuyau.Net Community Portal

Simunjan District
Towns in Sarawak